Antron Singleton (born September 15, 1976), better known by his stage name Big Lurch, is a convicted murderer, cannibal and former rapper. He is serving a life sentence for murdering 21-year-old roommate Tynisha Ysais and eating parts of her body in April 2002. He was a member of the group Cosmic Slop Shop.

Biography 
Born in Dallas, Texas, Singleton grew up nearby in East Dallas, Texas.

Murder and lawsuit 
On April 10, 2002, 25-year-old Singleton murdered his 21-year-old roommate Tynisha Ysais in the apartment he shared with her and her boyfriend in Los Angeles, California.

The victim was found in her apartment at night by a friend. Her chest had been torn open and a three-inch blade was found broken off in her scapula. Teeth marks were found on her face and on her lungs, which had been torn from her chest. The friend testified that Singleton was naked and covered in blood, standing on the street and staring at the sky. A medical examination performed shortly after his capture found human flesh in his stomach that was not his own. The victim's boyfriend said he and the aspiring rapper used PCP the day before the murder took place.

On November 7, 2003, Singleton was sentenced to life in prison without the possibility of parole. He had been convicted of murder and aggravated mayhem the previous June after pleading not guilty by reason of insanity at the time of the murder.<ref
 name="LAT_2003-06-17"></ref> The defense argued that Singleton was in a psychotic state due to his use of PCP the night before the murder. The court ruled that his intoxication and claimed insanity were not satisfactory reasons for committing the crime. The district attorney argued that drug use can not be used as grounds for an insanity plea in California, and the judge agreed.

Ysais' mother filed a wrongful death lawsuit in 2003 against Singleton, his bodyguard, Stress Free Records, Death Row Records, and Ysais' boyfriend. The suit charged that the labels had provided Singleton with drugs "to encourage [him] to act out in an extreme violent manner so as to make him more marketable as a 'gangsta rap' artist." "Part of what makes a Gangsta Rap artist marketable is the fact that the artist is a participant in violent activities," the lawsuit claimed. Death Row protested it had no connection to Singleton and was dropped from the lawsuit.

He was interviewed for the 2011 documentary Rhyme and Punishment. His was one of two stories of drug-intoxicated cannibalism depicted in a 2013 television pilot.

Singleton is currently incarcerated at California Health Care Facility in Stockton, California.

Discography

It's All Bad (2004)
Da Family (with Cosmic Slop Shop) (1998)

References 

1976 births
2002 murders in the United States
Living people
African-American male rappers
American male rappers
American cannibals
American people convicted of murder
American prisoners sentenced to life imprisonment
People convicted of murder by California
People from Dallas
Prisoners sentenced to life imprisonment by California
21st-century American criminals
Horrorcore artists
Rappers from Dallas
Southern hip hop musicians
Gangsta rappers
21st-century American rappers
21st-century American male musicians
20th-century American male musicians
20th-century African-American musicians
21st-century African-American musicians